This is a list of public art in the Nottinghamshire county of England. This list applies only to works of public art on permanent display in an outdoor public space. For example, this does not include artworks in museums.

Newark

Nottingham

References 

Nottinghamshire
Public art
Public art